Jared Ryan B. Dillinger (born January 6, 1984) is a Filipino-American professional basketball player for the Barangay Ginebra San Miguel of the Philippine Basketball Association (PBA). Dillinger is the second pick overall in the very talented draft class of 2008. He is a very versatile player that can play the 2, 3, and occasionally the 4 position. In his rookie year, he was included in the RP Training Pool under coach Yeng Guiao.

Early career
Jared Ryan Dillinger was born on January 6, 1984, in Rapid City, South Dakota to a Filipina mother and American father. He originally played for the U.S. Air Force Academy, then transferred to Hawaii, and was a starter on his last year. Dillinger averaged 31 minutes, 9.7 points, and 2 assists. He shot 38.3 percent from the 3-point line as a senior.

He first played for the Pampanga Buddies in the Liga Pilipinas to meet the requirements of the PBA which was to play 25 amateur games before entering the PBA draft. He soon got drafted by Talk’N’Text and was a part of the  dynasty where he won 5 championships in a span in 4 years.

Professional career
Dillinger was drafted second overall by the Talk 'N Text Tropang Texters in the 2008 PBA draft.

In June 2013, in the middle of the 2013 PBA Commissioner's Cup, Dillinger was traded to sister team Meralco Bolts in a three-team trade that also involved Barako Bull Energy. He was traded to Barangay Ginebra in 2019.

PBA career statistics

As of the end of 2021 season

Season-by-season averages

|-
| align=left | 
| align=left | Talk 'N Text
| 45 || 26.0 || .377 || .310 || .520 || 4.3 || 1.6 || .8 || .5 || 10.7
|-
| align=left | 
| align=left | Talk 'N Text
| 43 || 19.9 || .374 || .038 || .606 || 4.2 || 1.5 || .6 || .2 || 6.7
|-
| align=left | 
| align=left | Talk 'N Text
| 44 || 17.4 || .391 || .306 || .461 || 2.6 || 1.1 || .4 || .5 || 6.2
|-
| align=left | 
| align=left | Talk 'N Text
| 48 || 25.6 || .401 || .379 || .537 || 3.1 || 1.8 || .8 || .3 || 10.2
|-
| style="text-align:left;" rowspan="2"| 
| align=left | Talk 'N Text
| rowspan=2|41 || rowspan=2|24.4 || rowspan=2|.351 || rowspan=2|.271 || rowspan=2|.619 || rowspan=2|3.0 || rowspan=2|1.5 || rowspan=2|.4 || rowspan=2|.2 || rowspan=2|6.5
|-
| align=left | Meralco
|-
| align=left | 
| align=left | Meralco
| 33 || 30.8 || .420 || .348 || .672 || 4.5 || 2.7 || .8 || .5 || 10.5
|-
| align=left | 
| align=left | Meralco
| 32 || 22.6 || .455 || .362 || .591 || 3.8 || 1.3 || .5 || .1 || 9.1
|-
| align=left | 
| align=left | Meralco
| 43 || 25.8 || .409 || .332 || .602 || 3.2 || 1.5 || .6 || .3 || 10.7
|-
| align=left | 
| align=left | Meralco
| 40 || 30.7 || .375 || .353 || .544 || 3.3 || 1.9 || .7 || .5 || 10.8
|-
| align=left | 
| align=left | Meralco
| 27 || 23.4 || .362 || .319 || .667 || 3.1 || 1.3 || .8 || .2 || 7.0
|-
| style="text-align:left;" rowspan="2"| 
| align=left | Meralco
| rowspan=2|13 || rowspan=2|13.0 || rowspan=2|.447 || rowspan=2|.400 || rowspan=2|.800 || rowspan=2|2.5 || rowspan=2|.6 || rowspan=2|.2 || rowspan=2|.1 || rowspan=2|4.3
|-
| align=left | Barangay Ginebra
|-
| align=left | 
| align=left | Barangay Ginebra
| 21 || 16.3 || .396 || .319 || .667 || 2.4 || .9 || .3 || .2 || 5.2
|-
| align=left | 
| align=left | Barangay Ginebra
| 13 || 12.8 || .310 || .130 || 1.000 || 1.9 || .6 || .3 || .2 || 2.3
|- class=sortbottom
| style="text-align:center;" colspan="2"| Career
| 434 || 23.5 || .391 || .326 || .568 || 3.4 || 1.5 || .6 || .3 || 8.4

References

External links
Jared Dillinger: First Look | Player Profile

1984 births
Living people
Air Force Falcons men's basketball players
American men's basketball players
American sportspeople of Filipino descent
Basketball players at the 2014 Asian Games
Basketball players from Colorado
Hawaii Rainbow Warriors basketball players
Meralco Bolts players
Sportspeople from Littleton, Colorado
Philippine Basketball Association All-Stars
Philippines men's national basketball team players
Filipino men's basketball players
Point guards
Shooting guards
Small forwards
TNT Tropang Giga players
Asian Games competitors for the Philippines
Barangay Ginebra San Miguel players
TNT Tropang Giga draft picks
Military personnel from Colorado
Citizens of the Philippines through descent